Sergio Enrique Pardo Valenzuela (born 24 February 1948) is a Chilean football manager and former footballer who played as a attacking midfielder.

Playing career
In Chile he also played for Deportes Ovalle, Lister Rossel and Naval.

After the 1973 Chilean coup d'état, he moved to Guatemala and played for Aurora FC, Deportivo Zacapa, Universidad SC, Juventud Retalteca and Deportivo Pensamiento, what was his last club. He won the titles of both the first and the second level of the Guatemalan football league system along with Aurora FC (1975) and Deportivo Pensamiento (1980), respectively. He also had a stint with CD Santiagueño in El Salvador.

Coaching career
He has had a extensive career, mainly in Guatemala. He made his debut coaching Tipografía Nacional from 1984 to 1986. After a brief stint with Dely, a soccer team from the United States, he returned to Guatemala in 1996 to coach Deportivo Amatitlán, with whom he won the Copa de Guatemala.

In Guatemala he has coached important clubs such as Xelajú, CSD Sacachispas, Deportivo Coatepeque, Deportivo Zacapa, Universidad SC, Heredia, among others. He has reached better seasons along with Deportivo Zacapa and Heredia,

As an anecdote, he has coached some Chilean players in the Guatemalan football such as Claudio Chavarría, Fabián Muñoz and Héctor Suazo.

He also had a stint with Belizean club Real Verdes.

In 2019, he retired from the activity due to the fact that he suffered a heart attack while he worked for Deportivo Achuapa. After being operated on, he joined Universidad SC. In 2021, he returned to Deportivo Achuapa.

National team
In August 2013, he assumed as manager of the Guatemala national team for the friendly match against Japan on 6 September of the same year.

Personal life
Pardo is known by his nickname Chico Pardo (Little Pardo).

He married Verónica Ordóñez, daughter of the former president of Deportivo Zacapa, David Alfonso Ordóñez Bardales, and has five children.

After his first experience as manager of Tipografía Nacional, he worked as a sport teacher for different departments of Armed Forces of Guatemala and for Julio Verne School. In the United States, he also worked for a bakery and as a stone seller.

Honours

Player
Aurora FC
 Liga Nacional de Fútbol: 

Deportivo Pensamiento
 Liga Mayor B: 1980

Manager
Deportivo Amatitlán
 Copa de Guatemala:

References

External links
 
 
 Sergio Pardo at PlaymakerStats
 

1948 births
Living people
Footballers from Santiago
Chilean footballers
Chilean expatriate footballers
Colo-Colo footballers
Deportes Ovalle footballers
Deportes Linares footballers
Naval de Talcahuano footballers
Aurora F.C. players
Deportivo Zacapa players
Juventud Retalteca players
Chilean Primera División players
Primera B de Chile players
Liga Nacional de Fútbol de Guatemala players
Association football midfielders
Chilean football managers
Chilean expatriate football managers
Club Xelajú MC managers
Guatemala national football team managers
Expatriate footballers in Guatemala
Expatriate footballers in El Salvador
Expatriate football managers in Guatemala
Expatriate soccer managers in the United States
Expatriate football managers in Belize
Chilean expatriate sportspeople in Guatemala
Chilean expatriate sportspeople in El Salvador
Chilean expatriate sportspeople in the United States
Chilean expatriate sportspeople in Belize